Bartosz Grabowski (born 11 April 2000) is a Polish sprint canoeist.

Vice world junior champion in 2017 at k4 500m (with P.Korsak, W.Tracz and F.Weckwert) He was European and world junior champion in 2018 (K1 200m). He had got bronze medal in k1 200m U23 in Piesti world championship. He won a medal at the 2019 ICF Canoe Sprint World Championships.

References

External links

2000 births
Living people
ICF Canoe Sprint World Championships medalists in kayak
Polish male canoeists